Zhang Ying (August 27, 1997) is a Chinese figure skater.

Programs

Competitive highlights

References

External links 
 
 

1997 births
Living people
Chinese female single skaters
Sportspeople from Qiqihar
Figure skaters from Heilongjiang